Traunstein  is the highest mountain on the east bank of Traunsee in the district of Gmunden, Austria. Because of its almost vertical walls ending directly in the lake and secluded, advanced position Traunstein looks like a boulder in the landscape. Its distinctive silhouette is visible from a great distance therefore it is often called a guardian of the Salzkammergut.

References

Mountains of the Alps
Mountains of Upper Austria
Upper Austrian Prealps